Hawys Gadarn (Hawys ferch Owain ap Gruffudd ap Gwenwynwyn), also known as the Hardy, the Powerful, the Intrepid, and Hawise de la Pole, (1291 – ) was the daughter of Owen de la Pole and the heir to Powys Wenwynwyn in Wales. She was married to John Charleton after seeking the intervention of Edward II of England to support her inheritance against the schemes of four of her uncles to take her lands.

Early life
Hawys Gadarn was born on 25 July 1291 to Owen de la Pole, also known as Owain ap Gruffydd ap Gwenwynwyn, and Joan Corbet. Her mother died while Hawys was young, and she was brought up and educated by her father at Powis Castle. Owen was the heir to the Powys Wenwynwyn, but had renounced his claim and was given the Barony under the crown of King Edward I of England. He died shortly afterwards, leaving Hawys an orphan at a young age.

Inheritance of Powys
On the death of her father, Hawys's only brother, Gruffydd, inherited his land in Powys. Gruffydd died in 1309, leaving Hawys as his heiress. As she had not yet reached the age of majority, she was placed under the guardianship of her uncles. Because she was a woman, four of her uncles disputed her claim on the grounds that she could not inherit property, and sought to split the land between themselves. The law of Wales prevented inheritance by a woman, but her father had placed her as a subject of the crown of England in his will. According to the nineteenth century historian Llywelyn Prichard, her uncles informed her that they would be taking the land she had inherited, and that she would live out the rest of her life in a nunnery, however Prichard does not give a primary reference, and there is no evidence of this.

She travelled to the Parliament of Shrewsbury and petitioned Edward II of England in person. She met with him twice, and on the second occasion he asked her to nominate someone to act on her behalf as the champion of her rights. She named John Charleton, whom she subsequently married, in July 1309. Together with Charleton and a company of English knights, she returned to Powis Castle anticipating that her uncles may choose to fight to defend their rights under Welsh law. Charleton led the English troops and captured three of her uncles, only Griffith Vychan escaping. She subsequently became known as Hawys the Hardy, the Powerful, and the Intrepid. Hawys became known for investing in monasteries, including beginning the work on the Franciscan monastery in Shrewsbury, where she was buried after her death in 1353. She had two sons, John, who became the second Baron Cherleton, and Owen, who died without issue. She also had a daughter, Isabella.

Notes

References

1291 births
1350s deaths
Year of death uncertain
13th-century Welsh nobility
14th-century Welsh nobility
House of Mathrafal
13th-century Welsh women
14th-century Welsh women
Burials in Shropshire
People from Powys